Julia is an American television series created by Daniel Goldfarb that premiered on HBO Max on March 31, 2022. It is based on the life of television chef Julia Child. In May 2022, the series was renewed for a second season.

Cast and characters

Main
Sarah Lancashire as Julia Child
David Hyde Pierce as Paul Child
Bebe Neuwirth as Avis DeVoto
Fran Kranz as Russell Morash
Fiona Glascott as Judith Jones
Brittany Bradford as Alice Naman

Recurring
Jefferson Mays as P. Albert Duhamel
Robert Joy as Hunter Fox
Judith Light as Blanche Knopf
Adriane Lenox as Virginia Naman
Tosin Morohunfolo as Isaac

Guest
Isabella Rossellini as Simone Beck
Erin Neufer as Marian Morash
James Cromwell as John McWilliams
Bryce Pinkham as John Updike
Christian Clemenson as James Beard
 A.J. Shively as Chef André Soltner
 Tracee Chimo as Betty Friedan
 Rob McClure as Fred Rogers
 Sam Brackley as Coco Van

Episodes

Production
The series entered development at HBO Max in September 2019 after being greenlit for a pilot order, with Chris Keyser showrunning, and Joan Cusack nearing a deal to star in the titular role. By March 2020, Cusack had exited the series, and Sarah Lancashire was cast as Julia. Tom Hollander, Brittany Bradford, Bebe Neuwirth and Isabella Rossellini were added in supporting roles. In March 2020, three days into initial filming of the pilot, production was suspended due to the COVID-19 pandemic.

In September 2020, David Hyde Pierce was cast to replace Hollander, who exited the project. In July 2021, Robert Joy, Erin Neufer, James Cromwell and Adriane Lenox were added to the cast.

Filming of the pilot resumed in Boston in October 2020. In January 2021, it was announced that the pilot - written by Daniel Goldfarb and directed by Charles McDougall - had been picked up to series, with an 8-episode order. Filming wrapped in September 2021.

The series premiered on March 31, 2022, with the first three episodes available immediately and the rest debuting on a weekly basis until May 5. On May 4, 2022, HBO Max renewed the series for a second season. In September 2022, it was reported that Rachel Bloom joined the cast for the second season.

Reception
The review aggregator website Rotten Tomatoes reported a 93% approval rating with an average rating of 8.0/10, based on 44 critic reviews. The website's critics consensus reads, "Sarah Lancashire inhabits Julia Child with infectious joie de vivre in this appetizing valentine to the iconic chef." Metacritic, which uses a weighted average, assigned a score of 76 out of 100 based on 20 critics, indicating "generally favorable reviews".

Amy Amatangelo, for Paste, wrote that the "series is billed as a comedy and there are definitely funny moments—notably when people are literally on the floor assisting Julia in the filming of her show—but Julia explores not just how pioneering Child was in showing cooking on TV, but how pioneering she was for television production in general. [...] Ultimately, the series hinges on Lancashire’s transformative performance. [...] The series thrives through its strong female characters". David Cote, for The A.V. Club, gave Julia a B+ and wrote that "each 45-ish-minute episode walks a line between sentimental period drama and high-toned sitcom. [...] Lancashire carries the season on sturdy shoulders". Cote commented that the "season arc is fairly standard" and that "the nearest Julia has to a villain is Feminine Mystique author Betty Friedan (Tracee Chimo), who chides Child at a public television gala for setting back the cause. It's a powerful moment that shakes Julia and complicates her status as female liberator".

Kathryn VanArendonk, for Vulture, called the show a "bracing, comforting hit of competence porn: people who care, doing their jobs well". VanArendonk highlighted that "the effort to loop Child into the cultural and historical context of her time makes Julia a better show than it could otherwise have been. [...] Julia has some flaws, but its good qualities outweigh the missteps". Caroline Framke, for Variety, compared Julia to The Marvelous Mrs. Maisel as both shows share the producer Daniel Goldfarb; the show "does a remarkable job recreating a specific slice of upper middle class life as anchored by a white woman whose outsized personality comes with similarly notable talent". Framke wrote that "even as the series (from showrunner Chris Keyser) identifies more complex themes at play — Julia's heartbreak at hitting menopause before having a child, her Black producer Alice (Brittany Bradford) struggling to gain the respect she deserves — it's mostly happy to skip along the (admittedly very charming) surface".

Both Framke and VanArendonk praised Bradford's performance as Alice, a fictional character based on the actual producer Ruth Lockwood, but criticized Alice's storyline in the show. Framke commented that "by making her a Black woman, Julia tries to be more inclusive than the reality without fully reckoning with what it would mean for a Black woman to be producing a show made by and catering to well-off white women who might fancy themselves more progressive than they truly are". VanArendonk wrote that while Julia shows Alice experiencing workplace harassment, it does not force the audience "to think about racism all that much. [...] Alice is an invention who feels too neatly invented".

References

External links
 

HBO Max original programming
2020s American comedy-drama television series
2022 American television series debuts
American biographical series
Television series by 3 Arts Entertainment
Television series by Lionsgate Television
English-language television shows
Cultural depictions of cooks
Works about chefs